An environment's plasmidome refers to the plasmids present in it.
The term is a portmanteau of the two English words Plasmid and Kingdom.
In biological research, plasmidome may refer to the actual plasmids that were found and isolated from a certain microorganism by means of culturing isolated microorganism and investigating the plasmids it possesses or by taking an environmental sample and performing a metagenomic survey using next generation sequencing methods in order to reveal and characterize plasmid genomes that belong to that environment.

See also
 Plasmid

References

Molecular biology
Mobile genetic elements
Molecular biology techniques
Gene delivery
Metagenomics